Percy Robinson (2 November 1881 – 29 January 1951) was an English cricketer. He played for Gloucestershire between 1904 and 1921.

References

1881 births
1951 deaths
English cricketers
Gloucestershire cricketers
Cricketers from Bristol
Army and Navy cricketers
British Army cricketers